Matthew Bouraee (born July 29, 1988 in Brooklyn, New York) is an American soccer player who currently plays for West Adelaide SC in the National Premier Leagues.

Career

Youth and College
Bouraee attended Wall High School in Wall Township, New Jersey, where he broke the all-time school single season goal record previously held by University of Virginia's current head coach George Gelnovatch. By scoring 31 goals in a single season, Bouraee earned All State First Team and All-Region honors. In his junior season Bouraee helped Wall become the #1 public soccer school in the state by winning a state championship.

Bouraee went on to play four years of college soccer at Cornell University in the Ivy League where he was named to the All Ivy League first team and the All America second team. Bouraee led Cornell in goals and points in all four of his years, and finished as the seventh leading scorer in the history of Cornell.

During his college years, Bouraee was a forward and eventual captain for the New York Red Bull NPSL team.

Professional
Having spent time training with the New York Red Bulls (USA), Sharjah SC (UAE), Red Bull Salzburg (Austria) and at the Pepsi Football Academy (Egypt), Bouraee signed a contract to play for the Puerto Rico Islanders (Puerto Rico) of the North American Soccer League in January 2011.

In 2012, he signed for FFSA Super League club Adelaide Comets (Australia). In his first season there they won the Carlsberg Cup.

On August 15, 2012, Bouraee made his first appearance playing for South Australia.

References

1988 births
Living people
People from Wall Township, New Jersey
Sportspeople from Brooklyn
Soccer players from New York City
Soccer players from New Jersey
Sportspeople from Monmouth County, New Jersey
Wall High School (New Jersey) alumni
American soccer players
Cornell Big Red men's soccer players
Puerto Rico Islanders players
Adelaide Comets FC players
North American Soccer League players
FFSA Super League players
Expatriate soccer players in Australia
National Premier Leagues players
Association football wingers